Libera Me is a 2000 South Korean action blockbuster film about a mentally-unbalanced arsonist and the firefighters who struggle to stop him.

Plot
Five months after his release from prison after serving a twelve-year sentence, arsonist Yeo Hee-soo terrorizes the city of Seoul with a series of deadly blazes. Yeo rigs each fire so that a second, far more lethal conflagration ignites shortly after the firefighters have arrived, causing further casualties. He then turns his attention to those members of the department he feels are interfering with his "mission", which develops into a game of cat and mouse with veteran fireman Jo Sang-woo.

Cast
Choi Min-soo - Jo Sang-woo
Cha Seung-won - Yeo Hee-soo
Yoo Ji-tae - Kim Hyun-tae
Park Sang-myun - Park Han-mo
Jung Joon - Lee Jun-seong
Kim Gyu-ri - Hyun Min-seong
Kim Su-ro
Lee Ho-jae - Kim In-ho
Park Jae-hoon
Heo Joon-ho - Lee In-soo
Jung Ae-ri - Jung Myung-jin
Park Ji-mi
Jeong Won-jung

Production
The film was shot in Busan, with the support of Busan Metropolitan City and its local fire department. Instead of using miniatures, it was filmed in real buildings throughout Busan using a special synthetic oil that allowed the crew to use actual fire.

Awards
2000 Blue Dragon Film Awards
Best Visual Effects: Jeong Do-an

2001 Baeksang Arts Awards
Grand Prize
Best Film
Best Actor: Choi Min-soo

2001 Chunsa Film Art Awards
Best Cinematography: Seo Jeong-min
Technical Award: Jeong Do-an

2001 Grand Bell Awards
Best Cinematography: Seo Jeong-min
Best Editing: Park Soon-deok
Best Lighting: Shin Joon-ha

References

External links
 
 
 

South Korean action thriller films
2000 films
Films about firefighting
2000 action thriller films
Grand Prize Paeksang Arts Award (Film) winners
2000s South Korean films
2000s Korean-language films